Undercover Heart is a six-part British television crime drama series, first broadcast on 1 October 1998, that aired on BBC One. The series centres on an undercover vice squad detective, Tom Howarth (Steven Mackintosh), who goes missing while investigating the murder of a prostitute. His wife Lois (Daniela Nardini), and his best friend Matt (Lennie James), who are also detectives, set out to search for him, but end up falling in love with one another. The series was produced by Liquid Television and created by screenwriter Peter Bowker.

The series also starred Lisa Coleman, David Troughton, Tony Curran, Trevor Laird, Buffy Davis and Leonie Elliott in supporting roles. The series was also screened in Australia in 2004. Notably, the series has never been released on DVD.

Cast
 Steven Mackintosh as Tom Howarth 
 Daniela Nardini as Lois Howarth
 Lennie James as Matt Lomas 
 Lisa Coleman as Sarah May 
 David Troughton as Jim Ryan 
 Tony Curran as Jimmy Hatcher
 Trevor Laird as Wesley Carter 
 Buffy Davis as Annie Gibson 
 Leonie Elliott as Holly Lomas 
 Jennifer Hennessy as Saffron 
 Andy Dennehy as Harry Blake 
 Nimmy March as Fiona Cullen
 Mossie Smith as Jade Lennox
 Samantha Dent as Shelley Marsh
 Michael Bertenshaw as Peter Drew
 Julian Harries as Patrick Iriving
 Stephen Churchett as Supt. Knowles

Episodes

References

External links

1998 British television series debuts
1998 British television series endings
1990s British drama television series
Fictional populated places in England
BBC television dramas
1990s British television miniseries
English-language television shows
Television shows set in West Yorkshire